Four ships of the Royal Navy have borne the name HMS Orwell, after the River Orwell in Suffolk, England

  was a  wooden screw gunboat launched in 1866 and sold in 1890.
  was a  torpedo boat destroyer launched in 1899, purchased in 1901 and sold in 1920.
  was an O-class destroyer launched in 1942, converted to a Type 16 frigate in 1952 and sold in 1965.
  was a  launched in 1985. She was sold to Guyana in 2001 and renamed Essequibo.

Royal Navy ship names